Arborg is the name of several places in the world:

Arborg, Manitoba, a town in Manitoba, Canada
Árborg, a municipality in Iceland